Robert Belden (born June 20, 1947) is a former American football quarterback in the National Football League for the Dallas Cowboys. He played college football at the University of Notre Dame.

Early years
Belden attended Central Catholic High School, where he was a teammate of future pro football hall of famer Alan Page. He became a starter at quarterback as a junior and registering a 4-3-3 record. In his final year, his team finished with a 6-3-1 record and he was named All-Ohio.

He accepted a scholarship from the University of Notre Dame, where he was the third-string quarterback behind Terry Hanratty and Joe Theismann. He tore his left medial collateral ligament during the 1967 spring practices and tore again the same ligament during the 1968 spring practices. As a senior, he was 3-for-3 in passing and 8-for-14 in his career, although he didn't reach the minimum playing time to be lettered.

Professional career
Belden was selected by the Dallas Cowboys in the twelfth round (308th overall) of the 1969 NFL draft, even though he never started a game in college. As a rookie, he was able to make the team after Jerry Rhome was traded to the Cleveland Browns and Don Meredith unexpectedly retired. He was active for the first game and was placed on the taxi squad the rest of the season.

He was waived on September 9, 1970 and placed again on the taxi squad. At the end of the year, he decided to leave professional football and pursue a career in the private sector.

Personal life
Belden worked at the Chicago Board Options Exchange, before being named the CEO at the Belden Brick Company.

References

External links
Hall inductee: Central QB Bob Belden held up the family name

1947 births
Living people
Players of American football from Canton, Ohio
American football quarterbacks
Notre Dame Fighting Irish football players
Dallas Cowboys players
Businesspeople from Ohio